Mirko Pandaković (19 August 1895 – 29 September 1962) was a Croatian cross-country skier. He competed in the men's 18 kilometre event at the 1924 Winter Olympics.

References

1895 births
1962 deaths
Croatian male cross-country skiers
Olympic cross-country skiers of Yugoslavia
Cross-country skiers at the 1924 Winter Olympics
People from Nova Gradiška